Tadeusz Żuliński (28 May 1889, Lwow – 5 November 1915, Kamieniucha), pseudonym Roman Barski, was an activist, member of Polska Partia Socjalistyczna - Frakcja Rewolucyjna and Związek Walki Czynnej (from 1908), Związek Strzelecki (from 1910). He was an organiser and commander of Polish Military Organisation (1914–1915).

References
 

1889 births
1915 deaths
Military personnel from Lviv
Polish Military Organisation members
Polish Socialist Party politicians